Leila Norma Eulalia Josefa Magistrado de Lima (born August 27, 1959) is a Filipina politician, lawyer, human rights activist and law professor who previously served as a Senator of the Philippines from 2016 to 2022. She was the chairperson of the Commission on Human Rights from 2008 to 2010, before serving in President Benigno Aquino III's cabinet as the Secretary of Justice from 2010 to 2015.

Known as a vocal critic of the administration of President Rodrigo Duterte, she was arrested in 2017 under charges linked to the New Bilibid Prison drug trafficking scandal during her term as the Justice Secretary. Later that year, she was awarded the Prize for Freedom by the Liberal International.

Early life
De Lima is the eldest daughter of former Philippine Commission on Elections commissioner Vicente de Lima and Norma Magistrado. She was born and raised in Iriga, Camarines Sur in Bicol.

De Lima completed her basic education, graduating as class valedictorian.
She graduated in 1980 from the De La Salle University with an AB History degree. She finished her Bachelor of Laws (Salutatorian) degree at the San Beda College of Law in 1985. She placed 8th in the 1985 Philippine Bar Examinations with an 86.26% bar rating.

Career
De Lima began her career as a staff member of Supreme Court Associate Justice Isagani Cruz from 1986 to 1989.

Human rights commissioner (2008–2010)
Leila de Lima was appointed as the Chairperson of the Commission on Human Rights under the Arroyo administration. She served this position from 2008 to 2010. Her two-year term was marked by high-profile cases such as the Davao death squads, human rights cases against Jovito Palparan, and the Maguindanao massacre in 2009.

Justice Secretary (2010–2015)
In 2010, Benigno Aquino III offered her the position of Justice secretary, for which she accepted. Her first high-profile case was the Manila hostage crisis, where 8 Hong Kong nationals were killed.

In 2015, during the leadership controversy in Iglesia Ni Cristo and its subsequent protests, de Lima was criticized for meddling in the internal affairs of the denomination.

Senator (2016–2022)
Leila de Lima ran as a senatorial candidate for the 2016 general elections under the Koalisyon ng Daang Matuwid of the Liberal Party. She finished 12th, after amassing more than 14 million votes.

De Lima condemned the Philippine Drug War and urged the Philippine Congress to investigate. She called for an end to vigilante killings of drug suspects. On her privilege speech at Senate on August 2, she noted that "we cannot wage the war against drugs with blood..." De Lima lamented the indifference of the new government to extrajudicial killings and warns that more innocent people will suffer if the killings fail to stop.

In 2022, De Lima ran for reelection as a senator under the Liberal Party but accepted defeat after she placed 23rd in the partial unofficial canvassing results which covered 98.04% of transmitted election returns.

Legal troubles

Allegations
On August 17, 2016, the Philippine President Rodrigo Duterte alleged that De Lima had been having an affair with her driver, Ronnie Dayan, who Duterte also alleged functioned as De Lima's collector for drug protection money when she was the Justice secretary. Duterte also alleged that De Lima's driver had been using drugs.
Duterte later claimed that he had in his possession wiretaps and ATM records which confirmed his allegations. He explained that he had received them from an unnamed foreign country. In September 2016, De Lima was removed from her position chairing a Senate Justice and Human Rights committee investigating extrajudicial killings. De Lima, later, admitted that she had a relationship with Dayan many years ago. Justice secretary Vitaliano Aguirre called on convicted drug lords, former prison officials and police officers as prime witnesses against De Lima in the Congressional probe on illegal drug trafficking in the New Bilibid Prison. Dayan went into hiding after being advised by De Lima to not attend the House probe, but he was captured days later.

Albuera, Leyte Mayor Rolando Espinosa had corroborated allegations that the former Justice Secretary and now Senator Leila De Lima benefited from the illegal drug activities of his son Kerwin Espinosa in Eastern Visayas. Included in the Mayor's affidavit is a picture of De Lima with Kerwin Espinosa in Baguio City. Kerwin Espinosa later testified that he gave her a total of P8 million to help finance her senatorial campaign during the May 2016 elections.

On July 19, 2019, the PNP–Criminal Investigation and Detection Group (CIDG) filed charges against De Lima and other members of the opposition for "sedition, cyber libel, libel, estafa, harboring a criminal, and obstruction of justice". On February 10, 2020, she was cleared of all charges.

Retracted testimonies
In late April 2022, Kerwin Espinosa, one of those who accused senator Leila de Lima of being involved in the illegal drug trade in the New Bilibid Prison, recanted his statements on the case, and said that he was coerced by the police after his father Rolando Espinosa Sr. was killed in jail. The Department of Justice downplayed Kerwin Espinosa's recantation, saying it did not affect their case against de Lima, who is currently detained, as he was not a witness.

In early May 2022, Rafael Ragos, former Bureau of Corrections director general and another witness in the de Lima drug case recanted his testimony. Ragos previously testified that de Lima accepted 5 million pesos from him via drug lord Peter Co, while she was Secretary of Justice, and that it was later used to fund her senatorial campaign in 2016.

Detention 

On February 17, 2017, a local court pressed drug-related charges against de Lima. On February 23, a Muntinlupa Regional Trial Court issued an arrest warrant against de Lima for allegedly violating the drug trafficking law. De Lima faces drug related cases for allegedly using her position as Secretary of Justice to acquire money from drug pushers to make their drug business operational even though they are imprisoned. De Lima turned herself in the following morning of February 24, 2017. She has also been referred to as a 'prisoner of conscience' by numerous international human rights organizations.

On October 8, 2022 de Lima survived an attempted hostage taking inside Camp Crame. Perpetrators are said to have ties with the Abu Sayyaf and attacked the cop on duty. The police reported that De Lima was safe and that the stabbed cop was rushed to a hospital.

Calls for release 
On March 16, 2017, the European Parliament condemned the wave of killings in the Philippines and called for De Lima's release. It expressed "serious concerns that the offences Senator De Lima has been charged with are almost entirely fabricated". Amnesty International regards De Lima as a "prisoner of conscience". Despite her imprisonment, de Lima continued to oppose the policies of Duterte and remained a member of the Philippine Senate and the Liberal Party. She was part of the debate regarding martial law. On May 29, imprisoned Senator De Lima wrote her 94th letter while in prison, stating "People choose to be passive, perhaps because they feel responsible for voting for him—but no. You are not responsible for what he does after you vote for him. You are, however, responsible for letting him get away with things like this with your silence. By electing him, he has not bought your souls and conscience—on the contrary, he now owes you his accountability." In late July 2017, de Lima was visited by members of the European Parliament and the Liberal International. She was unable to vote against the martial law extension because of her detention. She petitioned her release but the Supreme Court rejected her request, and later slapped her with the affirmation of the release of numerous prisoners guilty of graft or corruption during the previous administrations. In September, the Council of Asian Liberals and Democrats (CALD) demanded the immediate release of de Lima and the restoration of human rights in the Philippines. In the same month, De Lima's ally in the Senate, Risa Hontiveros, caught justice secretary Vitaliano Aguirre II drafting fabricated charges against her through text messages during a hearing on the deaths of minors caused by the Philippine Drug War. The same tactic was used by the same secretary against De Lima, which led to her arrest.
On June 5, 2020, the Amnesty International called on Philippine authorities demanding for an unconditional release of Senator de Lima. The organization also called for the authorities to end unreasonable restrictions imposed on her; permit communication with her family, lawyers, staff and doctors; and allow her to undertake her role as an elected legislator and a human rights defender.

Statements from detention 
By October 2017, de Lima released numerous statements while in prison condemning the death toll of the Philippine Drug War which has increased to 14,000 Filipino deaths, where a huge number were children, infants, and teenagers. In November 2017, de Lima was awarded the Prize for Freedom by Liberal International, becoming the second Filipino to receive the prestigious award after Corazon Aquino. On December 5, 2017, she was again bestowed with the Leading Global Thinker award by Foreign Policy for the second consecutive year. In the same month, de Lima criticized Duterte for his pivot to China, citing what happened in Sri Lanka, Myanmar, Malaysia, and Cambodia, where those countries were put by China in a debt trap after accepting Chinese loans, leading to China's economic control on those countries. In January 2018, de Lima hit Duterte when it was revealed that the debt of the country ballooned to 6.6 trillion and the debt-to-GDP ratio expanded into 36.4%. She also criticized the government for 'bowing down' to China amidst the South China Sea dispute and Chinese exploration in the Benham Rise.

On February 1, 2018, Senator de Lima topped Asian Correspondent's list of five prominent Southeast Asian leaders and human rights defenders who are facing charges for defying the norm. On February 3, de Lima was dubbed as the "conscience of our time" by an independent news agency. On February 5, the Ombudsman of the Philippines cleared de Lima from all charges of financial terrorism and violation of the anti-graft law. On February 20, during the World Day of Social Justice, all ethics complaints filed against de Lima were junked by the Philippine Senate. A day later, the ASEAN Parliamentarians for Human Rights (APHR) called for the immediate and unconditional release of Senator de Lima and cited her 'heroism' against corruption and autocracy. It was followed by the Senate minority bloc, liberal members of the House of Representatives, and Amnesty International pushing anew for the release of de Lima. On February 23, de Lima's supporters launched an e-book in the Quezon office of the Philippine Commission on Human Rights, entitled, "Dispatches from Crame I", which contained almost half of all the letters and statements written by de Lima during her first year of incarceration.

On March 3, 2018, de Lima sought the approval of the court to let her attend the looming impeachment trial against Chief Justice Maria Lourdes Sereno.  She also sought Senate inquiries regarding the terms of loans of the government's infrastructure program, which has indebted the country vigorously in just a few months, and the anti-money laundering law compliance after the Ombudsman dropped all money laundering cases against Duterte due to the incumbent administration's threats. On March 10, a court approved de Lima's medical furlough due to problems in her liver. On March 13, the self-confessed drug lords were freed by the government due to 'lack of evidences'. On March 29, the Human Rights Watch (HRW) and the Inter Parliamentary Union (IPU) called for the release of de Lima due to the insufficiency of evidence filed against her. On April 4, de Lima filed a dismissal for the ouster petition filed against Chief Justice Sereno. On April 5, Justice Secretary Vitaliano Aguirre II, who initiated the imprisonment of de Lima, resigned from his post after evidences on corruption surfaced to media attention, along with his acquittal of self-confessed drug lords. On April 20, de Lima was named by Fortune Magazine as one of the 'World's 50 Greatest Leaders' for 2018. On May 13, de Lima joined liberal senators in condemning the ouster of Supreme Court Chief Justice Sereno through a quo warranto, which de Lima said was an unconstitutional way to oust an impeachable officer.

On May 28, the Muntinlupa court denied de Lima's plea to attend the law graduation of her youngest son, Vincent. The court stated that de Lima 'cannot be given a different treatment as that of other prisoners'. On May 29, Amnesty International conferred to de Lima the first ever “Most Distinguished Human Rights Defender” award during the Ignite Awards for Human Rights. She was also declared one of the world's “Women Human Rights Defenders Under Threat”. On May 30, de Lima filed a motion to reconsider her plea to attend her son's graduation, citing convicted plunderer and ex-senator Jinggoy Estrada, who was allowed by the Sandinganbayan to attend his son's graduation in 2015. On June 1, de Lima filed a resolution seeking to probe the blacklisted Chinese firms that were banned by the World Bank due to corrupt practices, but still were accepted by the Duterte administration in the rehabilitation of Marawi. Hours before her son's graduation on June 3, Presiding Judge Amelia Fabros-Corpuz of the Muntinlupa Regional Trial Court Branch 205 rejected de Lima's motion for reconsideration in attending to her son's law graduation. On June 3, de Lima filed a resolution seeking to probe the state-sponsored immigration of Chinese citizens into the Philippines which has caused the unemployment of Filipinos. On June 5, de Lima called solicitor-general Jose Calida as a 'role model in government corruption' after Calida's multi-million corruption scandal surfaced. Calida was one of the personalities that spearheaded de Lima's arrest. On June 6, the Supreme Court of the Philippines, without the ousted Chief Justice, upheld the 'constitutionality' of de Lima's arrest based on drug charges filed by Aguirre, blasting calls from international human rights organizations. The Supreme Court added that 'no further pleadings will be entertained', effectively blocking all remedies for release.

On July 25, de Lima wrote a letter expressing her dismay on the ascension of Duterte ally and former president Gloria Macapagal Arroyo, as the country's new House Speaker. De Lima, however, added that Arroyo's rise to power via unconstitutional means has led to the rise of the country's 'true minority'. On July 28, de Lima formally accepted the Prize for Freedom in absentia. On July 31, de Lima called on Congress to pass a bill seeking to prohibit premature campaigning in elections. On the same day, she also pushed for a bill that seeks to increase the pension of qualified indigent senior citizens.

On August 1, de Lima welcomed the indictment against porkbarrel mastermind Janet Lim-Napoles. On August 3, Ronnie Dayan, one of the persons used by the Department of Justice to imprison de Lima, formally refused to testify against the senator's alleged 'disobedience case'. On August 4, de Lima and other senators spearheaded the need to probe the conditions of displaced persons in war-torn areas of Mindanao, notably Marawi. On August 6, the Supreme Court of the Philippines denied de Lima's plea to allow her to join the Senate debates regarding Duterte's initiative to withdraw the Philippines from the International Criminal Court. On August 7, de Lima pushed for the passage of the calamity leave bill, which would provide 5 days of calamity leave for workers. On August 10, eighteen months after her imprisonment, de Lima was finally arraigned in the drug cases established by the Department of Justice. She also sought the passage of the Pedestrian Safety Act. On August 11, de Lima filed a bill on incentivizing the use of solar energy in households. On the same day, she joined other senators in calling for a ban on single-occupancy vehicles on EDSA.
On August 18, senator de Lima expressed the need to probe the Bureau of Immigration's P869-M loss from express lane fees.

On August 24, minority senators called on the Supreme Court to allow de Lima to be present during the ICC withdrawal case through video conference. On August 25, de Lima called for a Senate probe into delays in the free irrigation law's mandated IRR. On August 27, on the birthday of senator de Lima, she released her second book, entitled, "Fight for Freedom and Other Writings", which collects her speeches, letters, and notes, as well as letters of support from prominent personalities such as Vice President Leni Robredo, former Hong Kong Legislative Council Member Emily Lau, and Liberal International President Juli Minoves. On the same day, Amnesty International called for the dropping of charges again, adding that de Lima is a 'prisoner of conscience'. Opposition lawmakers also called for the release of de Lima. On August 30, 2018, de Lima filed a bill that would raise the statutory age of rape to 18.

Writings
On February 22, 2018, senator Leila de Lima announced that she would launch an e-book, entitled, "Dispatches from Crame I" on February 23, a day before the anniversary of her incarceration. On February 23, the e-book was officially launched in the Quezon city office of the Philippine Commission on Human Rights. The e-book contained all the statements and letters written by de Lima since she was detained on February 24, 2017. It also contained statements from her supporters from various local and international organizations and personalities.

On June 1, 2018, the book of de Lima's spiritual adviser, Fr. Robert Reyes, entitled, "Prisoner of Conscience Prisoner of Hope", was launched. The book contained various accounts from different personalities giving their views of and conversations with de Lima during her incarceration.

On August 27, 2018, on the birthday of senator de Lima, she released her second book, entitled, "Fight for Freedom and Other Writings", which collects her speeches, letters, and notes, as well as letters of support from prominent personalities such as Vice President Leni Robredo, former Hong Kong Legislative Council Member Emily Lau, and Liberal International President Juli Minoves.

Personal life
De Lima was married for more than thirty years to lawyer Pláridel Bohol. From this marriage, she has two adult children.

De Lima's aunt, Julie de Lima, married Communist Party of the Philippines founder Jose Maria Sison, making him Leila de Lima's uncle by marriage. Another aunt of hers, Lilia de Lima, served as the head of the Philippine Economic Zone Authority and is a Ramon Magsaysay Awardee.

Honors and recognition
MetroBank Foundation Professorial Chair for Public Service and Governance (2010)
Excellent Public Servant Award (2010)
Defender of People's Rights (2010)
“Agent of Change” Award (2010)
Most Outstanding Alumna Award 2010 by San Beda University
Most Outstanding Alumna Award 2011 by San Beda University
2016 Global Thinker Award by Foreign Policy
Top Most Influential People for 2017 by Time Magazine
Women Human Rights Defenders for 2017 by Amnesty International
On October 31, 2017, Liberal International awarded de Lima the Prize For Freedom, the federation's highest human rights honor. De Lima is the second Filipino to obtain the award after former President Corazon Aquino in 1987.
2017 Leading Global Thinker Award
World's 50 Greatest Leaders for 2018 by Fortune Magazine
2018 Southeast Asia's Women to Watch by The Diplomat
2018 Most Distinguished Human Rights Defender Award by Amnesty International
2018 Women Human Rights Defenders Under Threat recognized by Amnesty International
2018 Human Rights Defenders recognized at the Human Rights Defender World Summit in Paris

See also
List of Filipino Nobel laureates and nominees

References

External links
 
 Senator Leila De Lima – Senate of the Philippines

1959 births
21st-century Filipino lawyers
21st-century Filipino politicians
21st-century Filipino women politicians
Aksyon Demokratiko politicians
Amnesty International prisoners of conscience held by the Philippines
Arroyo administration personnel
Benigno Aquino III administration cabinet members
Bicolano politicians
Chairpersons of the Commission on Human Rights of the Philippines
De La Salle University alumni
Filipino human rights activists
Filipino women lawyers
Filipino prisoners and detainees
Women members of the Cabinet of the Philippines
Liberal Party (Philippines) politicians
Living people
People from Iriga
People of the Philippine Drug War
San Beda University alumni
Secretaries of Justice of the Philippines
Senators of the 17th Congress of the Philippines
Senators of the 18th Congress of the Philippines
Female justice ministers
Women members of the Senate of the Philippines
Women human rights activists